Paropsivora is a genus of tachinid flies in the family Tachinidae.

Species
Paropsivora asiatica Shima, 1994
Paropsivora australis (Macquart, 1847)
Paropsivora graciliseta (Macquart, 1847)
Paropsivora grisea Malloch, 1934
Paropsivora tessellata (Macquart, 1846)

References

Diptera of Asia
Diptera of Australasia
Exoristinae
Tachinidae genera
Taxa named by John Russell Malloch